101 (one hundred [and] one) is the natural number following 100 and preceding 102.

It is variously pronounced "one hundred and one" / "a hundred and one", "one hundred one" / "a hundred one", and "one oh one". As an ordinal number, 101st (one hundred [and] first), rather than 101th, is the correct form.

In mathematics
101 is:
the 26th prime number and the smallest above 100.
a palindromic number in decimal, and so a palindromic prime.
a Chen prime since 103 is also prime, with which it makes a twin prime pair.
a sexy prime since 107 and 113 are also prime, with which it makes a sexy prime triplet.
a unique prime because the period length of its reciprocal is unique among primes.
an Eisenstein prime with no imaginary part and real part of the form .
the fifth alternating factorial.
a centered decagonal number.
the only existing prime with alternating 1s and 0s in decimal and the largest known prime of the form .
 the number of compositions of 12 into distinct parts.

Given 101, the Mertens function returns 0. It is the second prime to have this property.

For a 3-digit number in decimal, this number has a relatively simple divisibility test. The candidate number is split into groups of four, starting with the rightmost four, and added up to produce a 4-digit number.

On the seven-segment display of a calculator, 101 is both a strobogrammatic prime and a dihedral prime.

In science
 In mineralogy, a Miller index of 101 is a crystal face that crosses the horizontal axis (a) and 3D vertical axis (c) but does not cross the 2D vertical axis (b).
 In physics and chemistry, it is the atomic number of mendelevium, an actinide.
 In astronomy it is the Messier designation given to the Pinwheel Galaxy in Ursa Major.

In books
According to Books in Print, more books are now published with a title that begins with '101' than '100'. They usually describe or discuss a list of items, such as 101 Ways to... or 101 Questions and Answers About... . This marketing tool is used to imply that the customer is given a little extra information beyond books that include only 100 items. Some books have taken this marketing scheme even further with titles that begin with '102', '103', or '1001'. The number is used in this context as a slang term when referring to "a 101 document" what is usually referred to as a statistical survey or overview of some topic.

Room 101 is a torture chamber in the novel Nineteen Eighty-Four by George Orwell.

In education

In American university course numbering systems, the number 101 is often used for an introductory course at a beginner's level in a department's subject area. This common numbering system was designed to make transfer between colleges easier. In theory, any numbered course in one academic institution should bring a student to the same standard as a similarly numbered course at other institutions. The term was first introduced by the University of Buffalo in 1929.

Based on this usage, the term "101" has been extended to mean an introductory level of learning or a collection of introductory materials to a topic.

In other fields

 Charter of the French Language, Bill 101.
 Taipei 101, the tallest skyscraper in the world from 2004 to 2010.
 101st kilometre, a condition of release from the Gulag in the Soviet Union.
 101 Ranch Oil Company
 Roi Et Province, a province in Thailand. The name is literally 101 in Thai language.
 An HTTP status code indicating that the server is switching protocols as requested by the client to do so.
 For a new checking account in the US, the number of the first check.
 A term used to define the number of keys on a standard 101 key computer keyboard
 101 is the main Police Emergency Number in Belgium.
 101 is the Single Non-Emergency Number (SNEN) in some parts of the UK, a telephone number used to call emergency services that are urgent but not emergencies. 101 is now available across all areas of England and Wales.
 iCar 101 is a roadable aircraft design concept.
 101 Dalmatians
 The Zastava 101 is a compact car by the former Yugoslav automaker.
 Highways numbered 101, the longest and most well-known of which are BR-101 and U.S. Route 101.
 101, a Depeche Mode album
 Vault 101 is the starting area of Fallout 3
 Lebanese Red Cross EMS Center at Spears is coded 101.
 101 is the identifying number of several infantry units in various militaries across the world, such as the American and Israeli paratrooper brigades.
 101 was the tail number of a Polish Air Force Tu-154, which crashed on 10 April 2010 whilst on its final approach to Smolensk North Airport killing all aboard including president Lech Kaczyński and his wife. See 2010 Polish Air Force Tu-154 crash.
 "l'ordre des Piliers du 101" is an important student association in Belgium since 1977.
 The Wonderful 101
 Korean reality girl group survival show Produce 101
 TV show Zoey 101
 In Hinduism, 101 is a lucky number.
 The house number of Samson en Gert in the eponymous Belgian kids' television show.

References

 Wells, D. The Penguin Dictionary of Curious and Interesting Numbers London: Penguin Group. (1987): page 133. 

Integers